St. Columcille's Hospital is a public hospital providing acute-care hospital services and located in Loughlinstown, County Dublin, Ireland. It is managed by Ireland East Hospital Group.

History
The hospital has its origins in the Rathdown Union Workhouse and Infirmary which was designed by George Wilkinson and opened in February 1841. The workhouse infirmary was re-designated a district hospital in 1920.

Services
The hospital provides 118 beds, of which 110 are in-patient acute beds, while 8 are reserved for acute day cases.

References

Hospitals established in 1841
Hospitals in Dún Laoghaire–Rathdown
Health Service Executive hospitals
1841 establishments in Ireland
Hospital buildings completed in 1841